Fabian Roosenbrand (born 18 December 1988 in Almelo) is a Dutch professional darts player, who currently resides in Enschede. He is not a full-time professional player, and currently makes his living as a painter.

Career

He won two Open events in his native country during 2007 - the Mid-Netherlands Open and the North-West Netherlands Open, but made his mark on the scene by beating favourite and number two seed Gary Anderson in the first round of the 2008 BDO World Darts Championship. Roosenbrand was making his debut on television and at the World Championship. It was also a major upset as Anderson had been widely tipped to take the title following his victories at the 2007 International Darts League and 2007 World Darts Trophy - tournaments which had featured players from both the BDO and PDC. He lost 4–1 in the second round of the competition to Australian Simon Whitlock, who reached the final.

Roosenbrand qualified for the BDO World Championship for the second time in 2012, but was defeated 3-1 by Ross Montgomery.

World Championship Performances

BDO

 2008: 2nd Round (lost to Simon Whitlock 1–4)
 2012: 1st Round (lost to Ross Montgomery 1–3)

References

External links
Official site (Dutch)
Roosenbrand's darts database

1988 births
Living people
Dutch darts players
Sportspeople from Almelo
British Darts Organisation players